Babette Mangolte is a French cinematographer, film director, and photographer who has lived and worked in the United States since 1970.

Life and career
Mangolte was born and raised in France and moved to New York City in 1970. She attended L'Ecole Nationale de la Photographie et de la Cinematographie, graduating in 1966. Her move to New York was prompted by a disillusionment with the French film industry's male dominated climate, and an interest in experimental works by American filmmakers such as Jonas Mekas and Stan Brakhage. In the 1970s she began documenting the performance works of notable choreographers such as Trisha Brown, Lucinda Childs, David Gordon, and Yvonne Rainer. During this time, she also collaborated with director Chantal Akerman. Together they made several films, the most notable of which are Jeanne Dielman, 23 quai du Commerce, 1080 Bruxelles (1975) and News from Home (1977). Mangolte shot her first feature, L'Automne, in 1970, which was directed by Marcel Hanoun.

Mangolte credits Dziga Vertov's Man with a Movie Camera (1929) as the film that made her decide to become a cinematographer.

She is known for her experimental film-making, which is influenced by the French New Wave and Structural Film.  She has made many films of dancers and performance artists, along with several documentaries and narrative films. Her films include both short and feature length. Her most recent film is Seven Easy Pieces (2007), a documentary of the performance artist Marina Abramović.

She is a professor at the University of California, San Diego.

Filmography
Directed, produced, photographed or edited by Babette Mangolte 
 
 1975 What Maisie Knew 58 min. 16mm B&W
 1976 (Now) (Maintenant entre parentheses) 10 min. 16mm color
 1977 The Camera: Je (La Camera: I) 88 min. 16mm Color
 1978 Water Motor 9min. 16mm B&W - Choreography: Trisha Brown
 1979 There? Where? 8min. 16mm Color
 1980 The Cold Eye (My Darling be Careful) 90min. 16mm B&W
 1982 The Sky on Location 78min. 16mm Color
 1991 Visible Cities 31 min. 16mm Color
 1993 Four Pieces by Morris 94 min. 16mm Color - Choreography: Robert Morris
 1995-99 Dismantle (an essay on photography) 16mm Color in progress
 2000 Homemade, 6 min. Super 8mm/Digi Beta Choreography: Trisha Brown
 2003 Les Modèles de Pickpocket, 89 minutes Digi Beta PAL 16:9
 2004 Roof and Fire Piece, 31 minutes, Choreography: Trisha Brown 1973, DVD, ArtPix
 2007 Seven Easy Pieces by Marina Abaramović 
 2007 Yvonne Rainer's AG Indexical with a little help from H.M.
 2008 Yvonne Rainer's RoS Indexical 2010 Slide Shoq 
 2012 Roof Piece on the High Line
 2012 Patricia Patterson Paintings
 2012 Edward Krasiński's Studio
 2012 Homemade (choreography Trisha Brown, danced by Vicki Shick)

References

External links

 at UbuWeb

Living people
French emigrants to the United States
French cinematographers
French women cinematographers
American women cinematographers
French women film directors
Year of birth missing (living people)
American cinematographers
21st-century American women
University of California, San Diego faculty